The Athens Grand Prix Tsiklitiria is an annual athletics event at the Olympic Stadium in Athens, Greece as part of the IAAF World Challenge Meetings. It was first organized in 1963, held at the Panathinaiko Stadium. Its name honours Kostas Tsiklitiras, who won four olympic medals at the 1908 and 1912 Olympic Games in long jump and high jump, both from standing position.

History
From 2003 to 2009 IAAF classified the Athens Grand Prix Tsiklitiria among IAAF Grand Prix meetings.

World records
Over the course of its history, two world records has been set at the Athens Grand Prix Tsiklitiria, for the same event and furthermore, the first (of 1999 edition) being surpassed by the latter (2005) on a technicality.  The technicality is Tim Montgomery's intervening 2002 world record (9.78) was later disallowed due to Montgomery's suspension for using performance-enhancing drugs.

Meeting records

Men

Women

References

External links 

Athens Grand Prix Tsiklitiria Meeting Records

Annual track and field meetings
IAAF Grand Prix
IAAF Super Grand Prix
Annual sports competitions in Athens
Recurring sporting events established in 1988
Athletics competitions in Greece
Summer events in Greece
Athletics in Athens
IAAF World Outdoor Meetings